Tenías que ser tú may refer to:
 Tenías que ser tú (1992 TV series), a Mexican telenovela
 Tenías que ser tú (2018 TV series), a Mexican telenovela